Stæremosen halt is a railway halt serving the southeastern part of the fishing port and seaside resort town of Gilleleje on the north coast of Zealand, Denmark.

The station is located on the Hornbæk Line from Helsingør to Gilleleje. It opened in 1988. The train services are currently operated by the railway company Lokaltog which runs frequent local train services between Helsingør station and Gilleleje station.

References

Citations

Bibliography

External links
 Lokaltog – Danish regional railway company operating in the Capital Region and Region Zealand

Railway stations in the Capital Region of Denmark
Buildings and structures in Gribskov Municipality
Railway stations opened in 1988
1988 establishments in Denmark
Railway stations in Denmark opened in the 20th century